Architectural painting (also Architecture painting) is a form of genre painting where the predominant focus lies on architecture, including both outdoor and interior views. While architecture was present in many of the earliest paintings and illuminations, it was mainly used as background or to provide rhythm to a painting. In the Renaissance, architecture was used to emphasize the perspective and create a sense of depth, like in Masaccio's Holy Trinity from the 1420s.

In Western art, architectural painting as an independent genre developed in the 16th century in Flanders and the Netherlands, and reached its peak in 16th and 17th century Dutch painting. Later, it developed in a tool for Romantic paintings, with e.g. views of ruins becoming very popular. Closely related genres are architectural fantasies and trompe-l'oeils, especially illusionistic ceiling painting, and cityscapes.

Western artists specialized in architectural painting

16th century

The 16th century saw the development of architectural painting as a separate genre in Western art. The main centers in this period were Flanders and the Netherlands. The first important architectural painter was Dutch Hans Vredeman de Vries (1527-1607), who was both an architect and a painter. Students of Hans Vredeman de Vries, both in Flanders and in the Netherlands, include his sons Salomon and Paul, and Hendrik van Steenwijk I. Through them the genre was popularized and their family and students turned it into one of the main domains of Dutch Golden Age painting.

Flanders
Salomon Vredeman de Vries (1556-1604)
Paul Vredeman de Vries (1567-1617)
Hendrick Aerts (between 1565 and 1575 - 1603)

Netherlands

Hans Vredeman de Vries (1527–1607)
Hendrik van Steenwijk I (1550–1603), the first to specialize in church interiors

17th century

Flanders
Pieter Neefs the Elder (1578-1656)
Hendrik van Steenwijk II (c.1580–1649)
Lodewijck Neefs (1617-1649)
Wolfgang de Smet (1617–1685)
Pieter Neefs the Younger (1620-1675)
Erasmus de Bie (1629-1675), between cityscapes and architectural painting proper
Wilhelm Schubert van Ehrenberg (1630–c. 1676) 
Jacobus Ferdinandus Saey  (1658 – after 1726)
Lievin Cruyl (1634-1720)

Italy

Viviano Codazzi (1606-1670)
Ascanio Luciano (1621-1706)
Andrea Pozzo (1642-1709), mainly illusionistic paintings
Luigi Quaini (1643-1717), not a pure architectural painter, but a contributor of architecture to other paintings

Netherlands

In the 17th century, architectural painting became one of the leading genres in the Dutch Golden Age, together with portrait painting and landscapes. Notable Dutch painter of the genre include:
Hendrik van Steenwijk II (1580-1649)
Bartholomeus van Bassen (1590-1652)
Pieter van der Stock (1593-1660)
Pieter Jansz. Saenredam (1597-1665)
Gerard Houckgeest (1600-1661)
Susanna van Steenwijk (1601-1664)
Dirck van Delen (1605-1671)
Daniël de Blieck (c. 1610-1673)
Hendrick Cornelisz. van Vliet (1612-1675): mainly church interiors
Emanuel de Witte (1617-1692)
Job Adriaenszoon Berckheyde (1630-1693)
Jan van der Heyden (1637-1712)
Gerrit Adriaenszoon Berckheyde (1638-1698)
Caspar van Wittel (1652 or 1653-1736)

18th century

France
Jacques de Lajoue (1687-1761)

Italy
Architectural paintings, and the related vedute or cityscapes, were especially popular in 18th century Italy. Another genre closely related to architectural painting proper were the capriccios, fantasies set in and focusing on an imaginary architecture. 
Stefano Orlandi (1681-1760)

Netherlands
Cornelis Pronk (1691-1759)
Jan ten Compe (1713-1761)

19th century

Austria
Rudolf von Alt (1812-1905)

Belgium
Jules Victor Génisson (1805-1860)
Jean-Baptiste Van Moer (1819-1884)

Denmark

Heinrich Hansen (1821-1890)
Jacob Kornerup (1825-1913)
Martinus Rørbye (1803–1848)

France
Charles Marie Bouton (1781-1853)

Germany
Wilhelm Barth (1779-1852)
Michael Neher (1798-1876)
Eduard Gaertner (1801-1877)
Max Emanuel Ainmiller (1807-1870)
Friedrich August Elsasser (1810-1845)
Hermann Gemmel (1813-1868)
Adolf Seel (1829-1907)

Italy
Giovanni Migliara (1785-1837)
Federico Moja (1802-1885)

United Kingdom

Samuel Prout (1783-1852), watercolours
Thomas H. Shepherd (1792-1864), watercolours

Modern art
Colin Campbell Cooper, paintings of skyscrapers
Eugeniusz Molski, Polish painter

Chinese architectural painting
In China, architectural painting was called "jiehua", and mainly seen as an inferior type of painting. Known masters of the genre include the 10th century painter Guo Zhongshu, and Wang Zhenpeng, who was active around 1300.

Notes

 
Painting
Visual arts genres
Dutch painting
Flemish art
Art of the Dutch Golden Age